Gulgong Holtermann Museum is a community project and a museum space located in gold rush town of Gulgong, New South Wales. Two of the town's earliest buildings, also featured on Australian ten-dollar note (see The Greatest Wonder) renovated and extended, house an interactive educational and tourist facility based on the UNESCO listed Holtermann Collection - photographs taken for Bernhardt Holtermann during the "roaring days" in the 1870s.
Public launch of the museum took place on 22 January 2015. Designed by architect Jiri Lev, the museum space is formed by a series of three interconnected multi-functional pavilions built behind the restored heritage street-front buildings. The first is used as an extension of the exhibition space and for temporary exhibits, the second an event space and the third a workshop space. The museum design employs passive solar heating and natural cooling and lighting.

The museum was built largely by volunteer labour.

The museum, also supported by NSW Regional Cultural Fund, was visited by New South Wales premier Gladys Berejiklian and minister Troy Grant on 2 July 2018.

Gulgong Holtermann Museum officially opened on 26 October 2019.

Photographs

External links 
 Gulgong Holtermann Museum

References

Museums in New South Wales
History museums in Australia